UNITECH International is a network between distinguished technical universities and multinational companies across Europe. The programme aims to provide future engineers and professionals with skills, experience, and a professional network to solve problems in the industry and society.

History
UNITECH was founded in 1999 by ETH Zürich's former rector Konrad Osterwalder and Hilti's former CEO Pius Baschera.

After 20 years, the UNITECH network has more than 1000 alumni from 12 different universities. 64 multinational corporate firms have been a part of this network. As of 2021, the network comprises 8 European universities and 12 corporate partners across Europe.

Partner universities
The universities are to guarantee academic excellence and have committed themselves to build a network with UNITECH International, which goes beyond traditional programs.
 Chalmers University, Sweden
 ETH Zurich, Switzerland
 Politecnico di Milano, Italy
 RWTH Aachen, Germany
 Loughborough University, United Kingdom
 Trinity College Dublin, Ireland
 Polytechnic University of Catalonia, Spain
 Institut national des sciences appliquées de Lyon, France

Corporate partners
The participating companies are not only seen as sponsors but as active partners who take on a role in the training and further development of the students. According to UNITECH International, the partners should fulfill a demanding profile in terms of international presence and market position.  

ABB Group
Buhler Group
Danfoss
Evonik Industries
Geberit
Hilti
Infineon Technologies
Roche Diagnostics
Truma

Former industrial partners include bioMérieux, Caterpillar, Covestro,  Lonza, Nokia or ZF Friedrichshafen.

External links
 
 UNITECH Alumni Association

References

University programs